Salem Ajjoub (born 1 September 1953) is a Syrian weightlifter. He competed in the 1980 and 1984 Summer Olympics.

References

1953 births
Living people
Weightlifters at the 1980 Summer Olympics
Weightlifters at the 1984 Summer Olympics
Syrian male weightlifters
Olympic weightlifters of Syria